"On Eagle's Wings" is a devotional hymn composed by Michael Joncas. Its words are based on Psalm 91, Book of Exodus 19, and Gospel of Matthew 13. Joncas wrote the piece in either 1976 or 1979, after he and his friend, Douglas Hall, returned from a meal to learn that Hall's father had died of a heart attack. It was recorded in 1979, with Hall as producer, published by North American Liturgy Resources and later purchased by New Dawn Music, a subsidiary of Oregon Catholic Press. It has become popular as a contemplative hymn at Catholic Masses as well as at Protestant services of worship.

It is now sung during services of many Christian denominations, including Pentecostal churches, and was performed at many of the funerals of victims of the September 11, 2001, attacks. It is often performed either at the beginning or the ending of a Roman Catholic funeral Mass.  It has been performed at many internationally broadcast papal Masses, was selected as part of the 2007 funeral Mass for Luciano Pavarotti in Modena, Italy, also broadcast internationally.

Joe Biden referred to and recited the hymn in his presidential victory speech on November 7, 2020. He said the song was important to his family and his deceased son Beau, who died of brain cancer in 2015. Joncas was "honored and humbled".

Cover versions 
In 1998, the tenor Michael Crawford released his album, On Eagle's Wings, on which Joncas' song is the first track.

The Italian DJ Gigi D'Agostino recorded a dance cover version of this song for his 2004 album L'Amour Toujours II, included also in the Benessere 1 compilation.

The Christian duo Shane & Shane recorded the song for their 2015 album Psalms II under the title "Psalm 91 (On Eagles' Wings)" covering the song based on Joncas' composition.

The Baroque pop singer Lana Del Rey recorded a cover version of "On Eagle's Wings" in 2020.

References

Further reading

External links
Listen Here: On Eagle’s Wings/En Sus Alas
GIA Publications
Michael Joncas CDs

Contemporary Catholic liturgical music
1979 songs
Christian songs
Songs based on the Bible